Natalia Lacunza Sanabdón, (born 10 January 1999) is a Spanish singer-songwriter. She first gained national recognition in 2018, placing as the third in Operación Triunfo of the Spanish reality television talent competition Operación Triunfo, behind Alba Reche and Famous Oberogo. While competing in Operación Triunfo, anuncia gira y actuará en Córdoba. In Spring 2019 she signed a record deal with Universal Music Spain and released her debut extended play "Otras Alas" in June 2019. The EP featured her debut single "Nana Triste", which features Spanish indie pop singer Guitarricadelafuente. The song reached the fourth position on the PROMUSICAE chart while the EP topped it for two consecutive weeks and earned a gold certification in less than a month. Her second EP, which she titled EP2, was released on March 13, 2020, topped the Spanish Albums chart for a week and spawned three singles.

Early life 
Natalia Lacunza was born in Pamplona, Spain in January 1999. Even since her early years, Natalia felt an emotional connection to music. As a child, she studied fiddle at her local conservatory. Coming from a family of musicians and actors, Natalia started playing minor roles in small theatre productions, since one of her uncles owned a theatre company. That was when she discovered her passion for entertainment and musical theatre. 
As a teen, she also learned to play the guitar and continued attending dance lessons, something she had been doing since childhood. 
Even though she did ballet at first, Natalia has shown a particular love for contemporary and modern dance. 

Barely two years into university life, she quit studying Audiovisual Communication at the University of Navarra to focus on her musical career. She started as a singer under the stage name Elian Bay which was inspired by James Bay, one of her favorite artists. In 2017 she auditioned for the musical television contest La Voz. She sang 'I Lived' by One Republic but was disqualified after the blind auditions. In June 2018 she auditioned for series ten of the Spanish reality television musical contest Operación Triunfo. She auditioned with the release of self-written track "Don't Ask", which was written in English. 
The audition was successful and she entered the show in September 2018.
Natalia would end up becoming one of the contest's favorite acts, which would eventually get her to the finale, shortly before Christmas. She earned herself third place overall.
In January 2019, she was picked as a candidate to represent Spain at the 2019 Eurovision Song Contest. In the end, Lacunza's spot was taken by Miki Núñez, which didn't seem to bother her in the slightest. When asked why, Natalia told the media about the pressure and liability of partaking in such a prolific contest as a new artist.

Career

2019-present: Otras Alas and EP2 
After leaving Operación Triunfo in December 2018 and failing to represent Spain at the 2019 Eurovision Song Contest, the singer began working on her solo projects. In February a co-headlining tour with her talent show peers started in Madrid. Said tour ended in Cádiz in August, comprising 13 concerts and reuniting over 120,000 fans. In Spring, Lacunza signed a record deal with Universal Music Spain to release an extended play. Thus, on June 4, 2019, the singer revealed that she would be releasing her debut single alongside Spanish guitarist and novel artist Guitarricadelafuente on June 14. "Nana Triste" received very positive reviews by press and general public and impulsed the careers of both artists. One week later, on June 21, she released her debut EP "Otras Alas" which featured underground artists Guitarricadelafuente and Marem Ladson and drew comparisons to Billie Eilish. The project was certified gold in Spain for selling over 20,000 copies after two weeks. The EP also topped the Spanish Album charts for two consecutive weeks. In July "Tarántula" was released as its second single. Throughout the year, the singer promoted her record at a special gala at Joy Eslava, at the Coca-Cola Music Experience or even at the 2019 New Year's Eve special TVE programme.

In January 2020 Lacunza was nominated for 'Best New Artist', 'Best Female Act' and 'Best Album' for Otras Alas at the 2020 Premios Odeón. She also started teasing her next project. On January 24 she released its respective lead single "Olvídate de Mí" on streaming and music download platforms. She performed the song at Operación Triunfo's eleventh edition. In February she released its second single titled 'Algo Duele Más' featuring BRONQUIO and collaborated on "En Llamas" alongside 2018 X-Factor winner Pol Granch. The EP, which she titled EP2 (and a raining cloud emoji) was released on March 13, 2020, physically and digitally. Lacunza was scheduled to do a few signing parties in selected cities in Spain and to tour the country from March 26 to late summer. However, due to the COVID-19 pandemic, all these plans were cancelled. The tour is set to begin in October 2020. EP2 debuted atop the Spanish Album chart. On June 19, Lacunza released a live extended play titled "En Casa", which includes four songs from EP2 performed in an acoustic version at her house. That same day a 2-side single vinyl that includes "Olvídate de Mí" and "Algo Duele Más" was commercialized in selected stores as part of the "Record Store Day" campaign, which hopes to save CD stores from closing.

Discography

EPs 

 Otras Alas (2019)
 EP2 (2020)

Live albums 

 En Casa (2020)

Singles

Lead

Other Songs 
 La Clave (2019) 
 "Corre" (El internado: Las Cumbres OST) (2020)

Collaborations 
 Nadie se salva (with Miki Núñez) (2019) 
 "Otras Alas" (with Marem Ladson) (2019)
 "llueve" (with Mori) (2020)
 "En Llamas" (with Pol Granch) (2020)
 "Modo avión" (with Cariño) (2020)
 "Enfance80" (with Videoclub) (2020)
 "Cuando Te Fuiste" (with Aitana) (2020)
"Si Volvemos a Querernos" (with Chill Chicos) (2020)
 "No estás" (with Maria Blaya) (2021)
 "Pensar en Ti" (with Gange) (2022)
 "Me He Pillao x Ti" (with Ana Mena) (2023)

Tours

Headlining 
 Tiny Tour (2020) 
 A Otro Lado Tour (2020-2021)

Co-headlining 

 OT 2018 en concierto (2019)

References 

21st-century Spanish women singers
21st-century Spanish singers
1999 births
Living people